The Olympian Gods are characters based upon Classical mythology who appear primarily in Wonder Woman, Captain Marvel and Aquaman comics.

History

Pre-Crisis era

New era

When a Godwave spilled forth from the creation of the Fourth World, the Earth was seeded with great power. It first manifested in the form of old gods, then of metahumans. Some of the oldest of these gods were hidden from the universe until the time of ancient Greece by the sorceress, Hecate. Hecate reasoned that the Olympian Gods (as they would eventually be called) were greatly weakened after usurping power from their father Cronus and the Titans of Myth. She feared that other powerful gods in the universe (notably Darkseid of Apokolips) would seize Earth for himself. Because of Hecate's enchantment, Darkseid wrongly believed that he and the other New Gods pre-dated the Olympians.

One day, the young Uxas of Apokolips came to Rome. There he spread tales of the great Olympian gods. Their following grew tremendously in Rome and so they created avatars of themselves; they were worshipped under different names. Uxas knew that each half of the pantheon would be less powerful than the original gods. Later as the alien dark and demon god Darkseid, Uxas would use this knowledge to crush Zeus himself.

Centuries ago, an argument between Aphrodite and Ares led to the creation of the Amazons, who have been guided and protected by the goddesses ever since. Ares' recent schemes to destroy the Amazons and his fellow gods led to an Amazon champion being chosen. This champion was the Princess Diana, daughter of Queen Hippolyta, whom Hermes escorted to Man's World. There she was called Wonder Woman. Hephaestus forged Wonder Woman's golden Lasso of Truth from the girdle of the earth-goddess Gaea, and her silver bracelets which he formed from the splintered Aegis of Zeus. While the Olympian gods were her patrons, other gods were her foes. Ares and his progeny, Deimos and Phobos, quickly set about challenging the princess in her quest. Phobos created the creature Decay from the "heart of the Gorgon", which Diana quickly dispatched. Meanwhile, Deimos recruited humans on opposing sides, inciting them to war.

Ares' daughter, Harmonia, chose to help Diana, however. She gave her a powerful amulet with the power to transport across dimensions. Diana slew Deimos with her razor sharp tiara, and from him acquired the other half of Harmonia's amulet. Finally, Ares stepped in to claim the talisman, but Diana bound him with her lasso of truth. He realized that to allow humans to war would leave no kingdom for him to rule. In failure, Ares declared that he would no longer trifle with the affairs of man, and also forbade his offspring from appearing on Earth. He also took the amulet and all the power which had been collected therein.

In defeating Ares, Diana was greatly injured. The gods were so pleased with her that they took her into the sea and healed her. Then, Hermes gave her winged sandals which would enable her to travel freely between Themyscira and Man's World. At some point, the god Pan was killed and replaced by a Manhunter android. It was this impostor who began a feud among the gods. The feud began when Zeus turned an amorous eye towards Diana, offering to make her a goddess if she participated in 'the ultimate sharing of the flesh'. When Diana and her mother opposed the great god, he was angered and punished Diana. She would have to complete a task for each of the gods, culminating in the defeat of the monsters beyond "Doom's Doorway". This doorway was the Amazon's charge for millennia and if Diana was unsuccessful, the Amazons would be destroyed.

Diana succeeded in her trials, defeating numerous monsters including Echidna, the Chimera, the Cyclops, the Hydra, the Harpies, and the Minotaur. Eventually, Pan's bones were discovered on Olympus but it was too late to save Diana from her labors. Joined by her mother, Diana did indeed destroy the demons beneath Themyscira with the help of the amulet of Harmonia (these demons were funneled into Ares). Diana also freed Heracles, who had borne the weight of Themyscira for eons while imprisoned in a stone form and had been scarred by various monsters. Heracles was accepted into Olympus.

Soon thereafter, the gods secreted themselves away for a conference. At this time, Darkseid attacked Olympus. The dark god ceased hostilities, though, as soon as he realized the place was deserted. When the gods returned, they had decided upon destroying Mount Olympus and undertaking a "cosmic migration" to the stars. Over Hermes' objections, they took several steps. First, the three elder brothers made a new pact to replace the original pact which divided Earth among them. Then, they combined the will of all the gods (minus Ares) and the strength of Amazon prayer, and used Diana's bracelets to amplify that power (the bracelets are all that remained of Zeus' Aegis; this Aegis was made from the hide of Amalthea, the goat which reared him. Thus, the old home was demolished and New Olympus was created. In order to properly establish this new home, it was necessary for the Gods to sequester themselves indefinitely.

Hermes defected from his brethren and would not join the migration. He had already involved himself in Man's World by stopping the evil Circe. Hermes elected to remain on Earth and joined Diana in her mission.

Wars of the Gods

Phobos returned alongside his sister Eris in alliance with Circe. Circe had amassed great power by bringing gods of various pantheons together. Among them were the Roman gods, who challenged the Olympians for their domain. It took much strength for Zeus to summon Hermes and Diana to New Olympus, where the gods had been trapped. Earth's heroes were able to turn the tide against Circe, but three gods died: Circe killed Hermes; Harmonia was killed by her sister Eris; and Eris herself was slain by Son of Vulcan. Zeus and the Olympians decided then to follow the call of Cronus and the Titans to help guide other worlds in the universe. New Olympus was left to the Roman gods.

For unexplained reasons, Heracles struck a deal with a mortal man, Harold Campion, whereby the two would exchange places (Earth for Olympus) Heracles used the mirror of Circe to conceal his identity and adventured under the name Champion. He cast a love spell on Diana and accompanied her for a time, until Diana discovered his true identity.

In the Gods' absence, the Amazons began to revert to clay. To justify the Olympians' return to Earth, Zeus summoned Diana and several of her friends to testify before him. It was Hippolyta who tipped the scales, however. She played a secret card which greatly swayed them. In truth, she simply reminded Ares that before her reincarnation, Hippolyta had been Ares' daughter, and thus Zeus' granddaughter. At this time, Zeus also granted strength and flight to Cassie Sandsmark. Soon, Highfather of the New Gods summoned Zeus and Heracles to once gain battle Darkseid. To this end, Zeus, Odin, Ares, Jove and Highfather merged into one being and entered the Source. When cast out, Zeus was gravely injured and remained bonded to Jove. Heracles returned with him to Olympus.

Their greatest champion, Princess Diana soon lost her life against the demon Neron. Hera (now presiding over Olympus) transfigured Diana into a goddess of truth and welcomed her to live with the gods. Diana was told she could not interfere with the daily lives of mortals, unless prayed to. Hera sits on the throne. The gods shared the secret of their division with Diana and decided to reunite their essences with those of their Roman counterparts. Diana could not be prevented from interfering with the mortal world and so she was banished to Earth. She was soon also stripped of her immortality.

The merger of the Greek and Roman pantheons did not sit well with the Roman goddess Diana. She accepted an offer of power from the old "Shattered God", separated from Artemis and betrayed the Olympians. Diana died in battle with Wonder Woman when she was crushed by a statue of Zeus. The Olympians were incapacitated, but Wonder Woman eventually found a way to awaken them in time for them to strike decisively at the Shattered God.

Merger of Pantheons

With the appearance of the Bana-Mighdallian Amazons, the Olympians faced a new prospect. Though devout Amazons, these newest citizens of Themyscira do not worship the Greek gods. Renouncing them millennia ago, the tribe instead worship a combination of Egyptian and middle eastern deities. The central gods worshipped by the desert Amazons are: Isis (wisdom and magic), Mammitu (judgement bringer), Bast (nature and feminine), and Neith (mother figure and protection). These gods followed the Bana-Mighdallian Amazons to Themyscira where they continued to be worshipped. Facing the situation with hands tied, both pantheons agreed to integrate themselves with each other for the benefit of their people. Though these new gods do not reside on Olympus, they are treated with diplomacy when called to aid the Amazons in a united godly role. Despite the gods mentioned being part of the inner-circle of deities in the Bana's belief system, less significant gods have been shown to be part of their godly pantheon as well such as Sekhmet (war god), Thoth (their only known male god) and possibly Ishtar (love goddess). The gods of Bana-Mighdall proved their loyalty to the Olympians by aiding the Greek gods in battle when the war gods Sekhmet and Ares previously devised a coup on Olympus. Wonder Women had two mothers.

Revolution
For millennia, the goddess Athena waited patiently for the chance to prove herself worthy of the crown of Olympus. As Earth society developed, the goddess of knowledge grew in power and cunning, and ultimately challenged her father Zeus for the throne. To win this challenge, Athena sent for her champion, Wonder Woman, to face that of Zeus — Briareos of the Hecatoncheires. Though she was still blind, Diana was aided by the winged Pegasus but seemingly fell to Briareos. Unknown to Zeus, this was a trick played by Athena and Diana to prove to the latter that Zeus had no compassion and was not a worthy ruler. Athena agreed to forfeit if Zeus would spare Diana's life, but he denied her, proving his unworthiness. This prompted the other goddesses to deliver the head of Medusa unto Diana, which she used to turn Briareos to stone. Athena took the throne at last, but Zeus immediately began plotting a coup with his brothers in Tartarus.

Athena immediately set Diana on a quest into Hades' realm to free the god Hermes. She descended beneath Doom's Doorway with Wonder Girl (Cassandra Sandsmark) and Ferdinand the Minotaur and was confronted by Zeus' alliance. Ironically, she might not have succeeded but for the machinations of her constant nemesis, Ares. Ares acted as a double agent and gained Zeus' trust, but when the opportunity arose, he killed his uncle Hades and assumed control of the Underworld. Diana then used Hermes' caduceus to revive him. Back on Olympus, Zeus asked for Athena's forgiveness, which she granted. Athena then also restored Diana's sight, but bound it to her own.

It was on this quest that Cassandra Sandsmark finally learned of her own godly origins. Her mother had indeed lain with Zeus, but Helena Sandsmark forbade Diana or anyone from revealing the truth to Cassie.

Not long after this, Athena sensed a dark destiny for the gods amidst the cosmic mechanations of Alexander Luthor Jr. In the crisis created by his chaos, Diana was forced to kill Maxwell Lord, and incurred the ire of the world's public. The U.S. government responded by mobilizing against Themyscira, and Diana realized that as long as she was a target, the Amazons would never be safe. Diana prayed to the gods to take the Amazons to safety, but got more than she bargained for. On Olympus, she pleaded against Athena's decision to remove the gods from Earth's affairs. Regardless, the gods departed, leaving Diana bereft of family and faith.

Aquaman has also had run-ins with the Olympian sea deities. Poseidon had long relinquished the title of Sea King to Orin of Atlantis, but when Aquaman's subjects lost faith in him, Poseidon arranged a challenge with his son Triton. Aquaman bested Triton and the godling fell from grace with his father. In anger, Triton slayed Poseidon and claimed his power. Aquaman freed Poseidon by appealing to Lord Hades. When they returned from the dead, Poseidon slew his son in turn. Disgusted with mortal affairs, Poseidon bequeathed his trident to Aquaman. Aquaman somehow lost the Trident, though, as it was last seen with Queen Clea.

Other ancient beings
Wonder Woman also met the Lamia of myth, who laid with Zeus and bore his children. Hera changed her into a snake-like creature and killed her children. She now lurks in the American sewers, acting as a benevolent caregiver to troubled children. She attempted to commit suicide using Diana's lasso (which she had her young friend Sneaker steal), but Diana stopped her and Lamia disappeared along with Sneaker, with whom she had developed a mother-daughter relationship.

Later, Wonder Girl also encountered the Empousai called "Lamiai". Lamiai bit into Cassie but recoiled when she discovered that she had god's blood. Before she could reveal Cassie's father, she was slain by Ares. Lamiai's brother Mormolykeia also battled Ferdinand the Minotaur during this quest.

Rise of the Olympian

 Check the page: Rise of the Olympian 
 Wonder Woman (vol. 3) #26–33

Members

In other media

Television
 Many of the Olympian Gods have made appearances on the Justice League and Justice League Unlimited animated series. Olympian Gods who have appeared include Hades (voiced by John Rhys-Davies in the first appearance, Bob Joles in the second appearance), Ares (voiced by Michael York), Hephaestus (voiced by Edward Asner), and Hermes (voiced by Jason Bateman).
 Athena appears in the Justice League Action episode "The Trouble with Truth", voiced by Jessica Walter.

Film
 Zeus, Hera, Ares, Hades, and Deimos appear in the film Wonder Woman with Zeus voiced by David McCallum, Hera voiced by Marg Helgenberger, Ares voiced by Alfred Molina, Hades voiced by Oliver Platt, and Deimos voiced by John DiMaggio.
 Although they do not appear in Justice League: War, the Olympian Gods are briefly mentioned by Wonder Woman during a conversation with Superman about the other five heroes, referencing Batman as Hades (who is just as dark and mysterious just as Maxie Zeus did in the "Fire From Olympus" episode of Batman: The Animated Series), Green Lantern as Apollo (the God of Light), Flash as Hermes (the Messenger of Olympus and God of Speed), Cyborg as Hephaestus (the Blacksmith of Olympus and God of Metal) and Shazam as Zeus (God of Lightning).
 The Olympian Gods are featured in the films set in the DC Extended Universe. In this franchise, the Olympian Gods are referred to as the Old Gods which is different from the comics.
 The Olympian Gods are featured in the Wonder Woman film. In Queen Hippolyta's story about Ares (portrayed by David Thewlis) which she reads to Diana that depicts the Gods in the story in CGI form, Ares was condemned by the other Olympian Gods for his warmongering which led to him killing the Gods where the images show him killing Apollo, Artemis, Athena, Hades, Hestia, and Poseidon until Zeus drove him off of Mount Olympus with his thunderbolts. In his dying breath, Zeus created Themyscira for the Amazons and left them the "Godkiller" required to kill Ares should he rise again. This happens during World War I where Wonder Woman managed to slay Ares.
 Zeus, Artemis, and Ares also appear in the film Justice League with Zeus portrayed by Sergi Constance, Artemis portrayed by Aurore Lauzeral, and Ares portrayed by stuntman Nick McKinless with David Thewlis' face super-imposed over his. 5,000 years ago, they assisted the humans, the Amazons, the Atlanteans, and the Green Lantern Corps into fighting Steppenwolf and his army of Parademons. Zeus used a lightning bolt to separate the three Mother Boxes to prevent them from fusing into each other.
 In the Snyder cut of the film, the Olympian Gods are shown to be actually fighting Darkseid and his army of Parademons. Ares is the one who defeated Darkseid by cleaving his shoulder.

Video games
 The Olympian Gods are featured in DC Universe Online in several instances. Ares, Hades, Athena, Hecate, Zeus, Hera, and Poseidon all appear in Wonder Woman focused episodes, with references to Hephaestus, Hermes, and Persephone mentioned throughout. Aphrodite also appeared in the first year's Valentine's Day Event, but has not reappeared since, being replaced by the Love Conquers All Event thereafter.
 The Olympian Gods are featured in Injustice: Gods Among Us. In Wonder Woman's ending, Zeus and the Olympian Gods fear that what happened in the Regime's reality might happen in their own and begin a campaign to wipe out all the metahumans. Wonder Woman and her Amazons rebel against the Olympian Gods for what they have done to the other metahumans. Zeus and the others are ultimately defeated, with the Amazons becoming the new rulers in their place. Additionally, Ares appears as a playable villain character and Athena appears briefly during Wonder Woman's fighting intro scene.

See also
 Olympians
 Rise of the Olympian

References

External links
 Olympian Gods at DC Comics Wiki
 Cosmic Teams Profile
 Religion of Wonder Woman
 The Unofficial Olympian Gods Biography

Wonder Woman characters
DC Comics deities
DC Comics characters who can move at superhuman speeds
DC Comics characters with superhuman strength
Greek and Roman deities in fiction
Characters created by William Moulton Marston
DC Comics species